Gabriele Fanti (born 22 April 2000) is an Italian  football player. He plays for Franciacorta.

Club career
He is a product of youth teams of Atalanta. On 18 July 2018, he joined Pergolettese on loan, in Serie D at the time.

For the 2019–20 season, Pergolettese was promoted to Serie C. He made his professional Serie C debut for Pergolettese on 1 September 2019 in a game against Pistoiese. He substituted Aboubakar Bakayoko in the 69th minute. He made his first professional start on 22 September 2019 against Novara.

On 29 September 2020 he moved to Serie D club Franciacorta.

References

External links
 
 

2000 births
Sportspeople from the Province of Brescia
Living people
Italian footballers
Association football defenders
U.S. Pergolettese 1932 players
Serie C players
Serie D players
Footballers from Lombardy